Pandora's Piñata is the third studio album by Swedish avant-garde metal band Diablo Swing Orchestra. It was released on May 14, 2012, in Europe by Candlelight Records and on May 22, 2012, in North America by Sensory Records.

It is the last album with the singer AnnLouice Lögdlund and the only album with Petter Karlsson on drums; he left the band earlier that year, after recording his parts. It is also the first album with the trombonist Daniel Hedin and the trumpeter Martin Isaksson as full-time members, with Pandora's Piñata being the first album with the band being an octet.

The band's first single, "Voodoo Mon Amour", was released before the album. An official video for "Black Box Messiah" was also released. All songs are credited to Diablo Swing Orchestra.

Reception 

Pandora's Piñata was acclaimed by critics. Sputnikmusic gave the album a "superb" rating of 4.5 out of 5 (same as the two previous albums), calling it "A sprawling tour de force that moves seamlessly between metallic technicality and full-throttle symphonic grandeur". Heavy Blog... Is Heavy gave Pandora's Pinata the maximum rating, praising "the variation that this album provides" and stating, "No track sounds the same, because each track shows off a different side of DSO."

About.com called it "Wickedly catchy, breathtakingly original and downright good clean". Dangerdog wrote, "Pandora's Pinata is immensely creative and devastatingly entertaining," and gave the album a 5 out of 5.

On a less positive review, Metal Underground thought that the band "Continues their off-beat avant-garde metal style, fantastic female vocals, oozes creativity", but criticized the "Lack of prominent male/female vocal interplay, not as heavy or catchy as their last album". The reviewer the album a rating of 3.5 out of 5, writing, "Slightly less compelling than their previous albums, but still a rousing interpretation of avant-garde metal."

Track listing

Personnel

Band members 

 Daniel Håkansson – lead vocals, guitar
 Annlouice Loegdlund – lead vocals
 Pontus Mantefors – vocals, guitar, synthesizer, sound effects
 Anders Johansson – Bass guitar
 Johannes Bergion – cello, backing vocals
 Daniel Hedin – trombone, backing vocals
 Martin Isaksson – trumpet, backing vocals
 Petter Karlsson – drums, percussion

Session musicians 
 Diana Lewtak – violin
 Erika Risinger – violin, viola
 Emilia Wareborn – viola
 Michael Carlqvist – double bass
 Elisabeth Jansson – horns
 Wictor Lind – timpani, percussion
 Anna Melander – flute
 Oskar Reuter – mandolin
 Lucy Rugman – clarinet
 Ekaterina Skidanova – oboe

Production 
 Roberto Laghi – production, engineering
 Pontus Mantefors – engineering
 Peter Bergting – cover art
 Anders Johansson – artwork

References 

2012 albums
Diablo Swing Orchestra albums
Progressive rock albums by Swedish artists
Swing revival albums